Lasse Rempe (born 20 January 1978) is a German mathematician born in Kiel. His research interests include holomorphic dynamics, function theory, continuum theory and computational complexity theory. He currently holds the position of Professor for Pure Mathematics, and Deputy Head of Department for REF at the University of Liverpool. Rempe recorded the voiceover for a BBC feature on the art of mathematics, where he explained how certain pictures have arisen from dynamical systems.

Name
From 2012 to 2020, he used the name Lasse Rempe-Gillen.

Early life and education
Rempe earned his Master of Arts degree in mathematics from State University of New York at Stony Brook in 2000 and his doctorate at the University of Kiel in Germany.

Awards 

In June 2010, Rempe was awarded a Whitehead Prize by the London Mathematical Society for his work in complex dynamics, in particular his research on the escaping set for entire functions.

In 2012 he was awarded a Philip Leverhulme Prize

He was elected as a member of the 2017 class of Fellows of the American Mathematical Society "for contributions to complex dynamics and function theory, and for communication of mathematical research to broader audiences".

Images

References

External links 
 
 

1978 births
Living people
Academics of the University of Liverpool
21st-century German mathematicians
Whitehead Prize winners
Stony Brook University alumni
University of Kiel alumni
Scientists from Kiel
Fellows of the American Mathematical Society